Zavin may refer to:
 Zavin District
 Zavin Rural District